Rag & Bone is the third EP by American alternative country band The Walkabouts released on February 1, 1990 through Sub Pop Records.

Artwork and packaging
The cover photo shows a scene in Western Montana. The source is listed in the CD liner notes of the Glitterhouse re-release as anonymous. The LP release included a lyric sheet and a poster. 57 LPs came on orange vinyl.

Track listing
All tracks written by The Walkabouts.

 "The Anvil Song" – 3:09
 "Ahead of the Storm" – 3:52
 "Medicine Hat" – 3:07
 "Wreck of the old #9" – 3:52
 "Mr. Clancy" – 3:17
 "Last Ditch" – 6:23

Release history

Personnel 

 Glenn Slater – organ, piano, noise
 Carla Torgerson – vocals, guitars, cello
 Michael Wells – bass, harmonica
 Grant Eckman – drums, percussion
 Chris Eckman – vocals, guitars, lap steel guitar, mandolin

 Additional musicians

 Alan Finston – trombone on "The Anvil Song"
 Bruce Wirth – violin on "Wreck of the old #9"
 Steve Fisk – trains on "Wreck of the old #9"

 Technical personnel

 Ed Brooks – production, engineering
 Tony Kroes – production, engineering
 The Walkabouts – production
 Steve Fisk – production & engineering on "Wreck of the old #9"
 Larry Brewer - engineering on "Wreck of the old #9"

 Additional personnel

 Charles Peterson – back photo

References

1990 EPs
The Walkabouts albums